Menteşe may refer to

Menteşe (district),  new name of the central district of Muğla Province, Turkey, effective 2014
 Menteşe (beylik), a principality in southwest Turkey in the 14th century
Menteşe, a sanjak of the Ottoman Empire, known as Muğla Province since the early 20th century
 Menteşe, Honaz
 Menteşe, Muğla, a town in Muğla Province
 Menteşeler, Köşk a town in Aydın Province